Charlotte Sophia Kasl, (née Davis, AKA  Charlotte Davis Kasl) (1938–2021) was a U.S. psychologist and author.

Life and work
Born Charlotte Davis on August 19, 1938, in Missoula, Montana, her parents were Mary Shope and Kenneth Pickett Davis. From an early age she showed a talent for piano and at age 17 she was teaching four of her own students. At the University of Michigan she earned her BA in Music and MA in Piano. She pursued piano studies for many years before becoming disillusioned with "the prospects of a music career in a department steeped in patriarchy."

Now using her married name Charlotte Kasl, she began studying psychology and in 1982, received her PhD in Counseling at Ohio University, which allowed her to "merge her deep and profound interests in complex family dynamics and relationships with the cultural context of feminism and sexual politics."

She pioneered the 16-Steps for Discovery and Empowerment as an alternative to the Twelve-step program for recovery from addiction, compulsion, or other behavioral problems.

She wrote several books based on some aspects of Sufi, Quaker, and Buddhist spiritual beliefs and traditions.

Lifetime Achievement Award, the National Council on Sexual Addiction and Compulsivity, 1997.

Selected works
Women, Sex, and Addiction: A Search for Love and Power, 1990. 
Many Roads, One Journey: Moving Beyond the 12 Steps, 1992. 
Finding Joy: 101 Ways to free Your Spirit, 1994. 
Yes, You Can!: A Guide to Empowerment Groups, 1995. 
A Home for the Heart: A Practical Guide to Intimate and Social relationships, 1998. 
If the Buddha Dated: A Handbook for Finding Love on a Spiritual Path, 1999. 
If the Buddha Married: Creating Enduring Relationships on a Spiritual Path, 2001. 
If the Buddha Got Stuck: A Handbook for Change on a Spiritual Path, 2005. 
Zen and the Art of a Happier Life, 2005. 
If the Buddha Had Kids: Raising Children to Create a More Peaceful World, 2012.

See also
Pagans in Recovery

References

External links
Sex Addiction and Women - Interview with Sex Addiction Specialist Dr. Charlotte Kasl. wsRadio.com.  6 segments.  April 30, 2003.

American women psychologists
21st-century American psychologists
American psychology writers
University of Michigan School of Music, Theatre & Dance alumni
Living people
Ohio University alumni
21st-century American women
1938 births
20th-century American psychologists